Events from the year 1694 in France

Incumbents
 Monarch – Louis XIV

Events
27 May – Battle of Torroella
29 June – Battle of Texel

Births

 21 November – Voltaire, writer, historian, and philosopher (died 1778)

Full date missing
Louis, Duke of Joyeuse, nobleman (died 1724)

Deaths

Full date missing
Ismaël Bullialdus, astronomer and mathematician (born 1605)
Paul Fréart de Chantelou, collector (born 1609)
Bernardin Gigault de Bellefonds, general (born 1630)
Gabriel Mouton, scientist (born 1618)
René Ouvrard, composer (born 1624)
Claire-Clémence de Maillé-Brézé, noblewoman (born 1628)

See also

References

1690s in France